Spectacle Lake is a small lake southeast of Wilmurt in Herkimer County, New York. It drains northwest via an unnamed creek that flows into West Canada Creek. Butler Lake is located west of Spectacle Lake.

See also
 List of lakes in New York

References 

Lakes of New York (state)
Lakes of Herkimer County, New York